The 26th Armoured Brigade was part of the British Army during the Second World War.

History
This brigade was converted from the British 1st Motor Machine Gun Brigade on 12 October 1940. It served with British 6th Armoured Division during the North African Campaign and then through the Italian Campaign. During this time it was briefly attached to the British 4th Infantry Division and the British 78th Infantry Division.

Commanders
Brigadier Charles Anderson Lane Dunphie 1942−1943
Brigadier Philip George Bradley Roberts March−June 1943
Brigadier Richard Amyatt Hull June−December 1943
Brigadier Francis Mitchell January 1944−July 1945
Brigadier David Dawnay August 1945−1946

Units
 16th/5th Lancers
 17th/21st Lancers
 2nd Lothians and Border Horse
 4th Queen's Own Hussars
 10th Battalion The Rifle Brigade
 1st Battalion The King's Royal Rifle Corps
165th Light Field Ambulance
B/72 Anti Tank Regiment
8 Field Squadron Royal Engineers
C Squadron 1 Derby Yeomanry
1 Guards Brigade
153 Light Anti-Aircraft Battery

See also

 British Armoured formations of World War II
 List of British brigades of the Second World War

References

External links
 
 History of Lothians and Border Horse Yeomanry

Armoured brigades of the British Army
Military units and formations established in 1940
Armoured brigades of the British Army in World War II